Senator Lowry may refer to:

J. A. W. Lowry (1848–1899), Louisiana State Senate
Robert Lowry (governor) (1829–1910), Mississippi State Senate
Sylvanus Lowry (1824–1865), Minnesota State Senate

See also
Walter Lowrie (politician) (1784–1868), U.S. Senator from Pennsylvania from 1825 to 1836